The College of Agricultural Technology (CAT Theni) in Theni, Tamil Nadu was established in 2010. It is affiliated with the Tamil Nadu Agricultural University. The campus has 15 classrooms, 8 labs, 1 exam hall, library and computer/language lab. Being a residential institution, a 150-room hostel separately for men and women is available. Co-curricular activities like National Social Service Scheme and yoga are also taught.

External links

Agricultural universities and colleges in Tamil Nadu
Theni district
Educational institutions established in 2010
2010 establishments in Tamil Nadu